Ramesh Chandra Lahoti (1 November 1940 – 23 March 2022)  was the 35th Chief Justice of India, serving from 1 June 2004 to 1 November 2005.

Education and early career
He joined the Bar in Guna district in 1960 and enrolled as an advocate in 1962. In April 1977, he was recruited directly from the Bar to the State Higher Judicial Service and was appointed a District & Sessions Judge. After functioning as a District & Sessions Judge for a year, he resigned in May 1978 and reverted to the Bar for practice mainly in the High Court. He was appointed the Additional Judge of the Madhya Pradesh High Court on 3 May 1988 and made permanent Judge on 4 August 1989. Lahoti was transferred to Delhi High Court on 7 February 1994. He was appointed a Judge of Supreme Court of India on 9 December 1998. He retired on his 65th birthday giving him a term of 17 months. His predecessor had a term of just 1 month.

Achievements
Justice Lahoti, a noted jurist, was economic with words and probably the least vocal among recent Chief Justices. He served one of the longest terms as Chief Justice in recent years, retiring from office after 17 months.

In November 2004, Chief Justice Lahoti, broke ground with many of his predecessors who had expressed concern about the growing corruption within the judiciary, by proclaiming that the judiciary in India was 'clean'. This was an astounding statement, especially in the light of frequent exposés in the media about errant judges across the country.

Chief Justice's handling of judicial transfers has also attracted controversy. In February 2005, Chief Justice BK Roy was transferred from the Punjab and Haryana High Court to the Guwahati High Court, on Chief Justice Lahoti's watch.

Population control
Justice Lahoti upheld a Haryana law that did not allow those with more than two children to contest local body elections.  He rejected arguments based on right to privacy and religion.

Migrants
He quashed the Illegal Migrants (Determination by Tribunals) Act on migrants to Assam.

Post-retirement activities
He was on the Advisory Board of the Indian International Model United Nations.
Justice Lahoti was also the Chairperson of the Advisory Board of the Faculty of Law at Manav Rachna University.

References

1940 births
2022 deaths
Chief justices of India
Rajasthani politicians
Rajasthani people
People from Guna district
20th-century Indian lawyers
21st-century Indian lawyers
20th-century Indian judges
21st-century Indian judges